Lenora Salusalu Qereqeretabua (born March 1968) is a Fijian broadcaster and politician. In December 2022, she was elected deputy speaker of the Parliament of Fiji. She is a member of the National Federation Party (NFP).

Qereqeretabua was born in Dravuni, Kadavu Province, and is the daughter of former Miss Fiji Eta Uluvula Qereqeretabua. In 1988, following in the footsteps of her mother, Lenora was crowned Miss Fiji. Since 1995 she has anchored the Pacific Community's Pacific-wide news show, The Pacific Way. She also worked as a public relations consultant and serves on the board of Save the Children Fiji. In 2015 was appointed to the National Flag Committee. 
 
In February 2018 she was announced as a candidate for the National Federation Party in the 2018 elections. During the election campaign she advocated for women's rights and more women in parliament. She won 1811 votes, winning the NFP's third seat in parliament. As an MP she advocated for a more professional media and the restoration of democracy in local government, as well as for the use of the Fijian language in parliament. In July 2019 she cut off her buiniga-styled hair to raise money for children with cancer. In September 2019 she was criticised for "cursing" members of the FijiFirst regime and their descendants after parliamentary staff who videoed Prime Minister Frank Bainimarama assaulting opposition MP Pio Tikoduadua were forced to resign. In November 2019 she attended the Pacific Parliamentary Forum in New Zealand.

She was re-elected in the 2022 Fijian general election with 3741 votes. On 24 December 2022 she was elected deputy speaker of the Parliament of Fiji, defeating Viliame Naupoto 28 votes to 27.

References

National Federation Party politicians
Living people
1968 births
Politicians from Kadavu Province
Fijian mass media people
Members of the Parliament of Fiji
21st-century Fijian politicians
21st-century Fijian women politicians